For Pablo Picasso's 1905 painting, see La famille de saltimbanques

Les saltimbanques (The Acrobats) is an opéra-comique in three acts, libretto by Maurice Ordonneau, music by Louis Ganne, first performed at the Théâtre de la Gaîté, Paris, on 30 December 1899. In the third act a ballet entitled Les Bohemiennes was danced by Julia Duval, Briant, the women of the corps de ballet and a troupe of acrobats, Les Manzoni.

Roles

Synopsis

Suzanne was abandoned as a child and taken in by Malicorne, director of a circus. She is friend with Paillasse (who loves her), Grand-Pingouin (who is also attracted to her), and Marion (who is Grand-Pingouin's lover). Suzanne is pursued by soldiers but rescued by a young officer, André, and the attraction between them is immediate. The brutal Malicorne abuses Suzanne one time too many, and she escapes with Paillasse, Grand-Pingouin, and Marion.

Suzanne and her friends have formed a little troupe called "Les Gigoletti". They are invited to perform at the Castle of the Count des Étiquettes, who is André's uncle. However, Malicorne happens to be there as well, recognises them and wants them arrested on the pretext they own him money. The Count pays the sum just as André arrives.

Suzanne sings a song she has learned in childhood, which is in fact a song the Count has composed and that nobody knows. From this song, it is discovered that she is his long lost daughter. Being of high birth, she and André can be married, but she also feels sorrow that she will be leaving her friends.

Discography

 Les saltimbanques – Mady Mesplé, Éliane Lublin, Raymond Amade, Dominique Tirmont, Claude Calès, Jean-Christophe Benoît – Choeurs René Duclos, Orchestre de l'Association des Concerts Lamoureux, Jean-Pierre Marty – EMI Classics, 1968.
 Les saltimbanques – Janine Micheau, Michel Roux, Robert Massard, Geneviève Moizan – Orchestra, Pierre Dervaux – Accord 465868-2
 Les saltimbanques (abridged) – Liliane Berton, Claude Devos, Freda Betti, Lucien Lovano, Guy Godin, Pierre Germain – Raymond Saint Paul Choirs and Orchestra conducted by Jules Gressier, Recorded at the Théâtre des Champs-Élysées, Paris, April 1953, Pathé (DTX 30.141)

References

Sources
 Le guide de l'opéra, R. Mancini & J.J. Rouveroux, (Fayard, 1986) 
 Pristine Classical, https://www.pristineclassical.com/products/paco031

Compositions by Louis Ganne
French-language operas
Opéras comiques
Operas
1899 operas